John Zurier (born 1956) is an abstract painter born in Santa Monica, CA, known for his minimal, near-monochrome paintings. His work has shown across the American West as well as in Europe and Japan. He has worked in Reykjavik, Iceland and Berkeley, Ca.

Education
John Zurier received a BA degree in Landscape Architecture from the University of California, Berkeley in 1979 and a Master of Fine Arts degree in Painting from The University of California at Berkeley in 1983.

Career and exhibition
John Zurier's work has been shown in galleries and museums since 1980. Zurier was included in the 2002 Whitney Biennial in New York City,<ref>{{cite web|title=Whitney Biennial, Whitney Museum of American Art, New York, NY, 2002|url=http://whitney.org/www/2002biennial/artists.html|publisher=Whitney.org|access-date=2015-11-27}}</ref> the 2008 Gwangju Biennale in Gwangju, South Korea. and the 2012 São Paulo Biennial in São Paulo, Brazil.  Zurier is represented by Anglim Gilbert Gallery in San Francisco, Peter Blum Gallery in New York City and by Galerie Nordenhake'' in Stockholm, Sweden and Berlin, Germany.  Zurier lives and works in Berkeley, California.

Style and technique
Zurier paints abstract, near-monochrome paintings whose colors range from muted tones to vibrant hues. Zurier's abstract paintings are informed by abstract expressionism, Post-War French painting, and Japanese aesthetics. His main interest is in simplicity, surface modulation, and color, as those are tied to people's experience of time. Zurier's reductive paintings show his dedication to color, the material fact of painting, and the history of painting. His soft-hued abstract paintings play at crossing the line into representation with the sensation of nature, the silence of luminous weather, and the human touch. Capturing qualities of light and weather effects, Zurier employs a range of brushstrokes and surface treatments, varying from revealing the texture of the canvas or obscuring it with layers of thick impasto. Zurier's work has been described as transcending the gestural and material to evoke the emotional. While minimal, Zurier's practice is not minimalist, but rather composed of quiet works that focus on the structure and possibilities of a brushstroke. “I think the Japanese painter Ike No Taiga [1723–1776] was right,” Zurier has said, “the most difficult thing to achieve in painting is creating a space where absolutely nothing has been painted.”

Selected public collections
Berkeley Art Museum, Berkeley, CA
Colby College Museum of Art, Waterville, ME
Farnsworth Museum, Rockland, ME
Microsoft Corporation Art Collection, Redmond, WA
Moderna Museet, Stockholm, Sweden
Museum of Fine Arts, Houston, TX
Oakland Museum of California, Oakland, CA
San Francisco Museum of Modern Art, San Francisco, CA
University of California, San Francisco Art Collection, San Francisco, CA
Principia College, Elsah, IL

Exhibitions
Selected solo exhibitions
John Zurier: Sometimes (Over Me the Mountain), BERG Contemporary, Reykjavík, Iceland, 2018
»A Mind of Winter«, Galerie Nordenhake, Berlin, Germany, 2018
Stars Without Distance, Peter Blum Gallery, New York, NY, 2017
At the Very End of the Blue Sky, The Club, Tokyo, Japan, 2017
Dust and Troubled Air, Anglim Gilbert Gallery, San Francisco, CA, 2017
John Zurier - The Last Summer Light, Office Baroque, Brussels, Belgium, 2016
East, Galerie Nordenhake, Berlin, Germany, 2016
Between North and Night, Galerie Nordenhake, Stockholm, Sweden, 2015
West of the Future, Peter Blum Gallery, New York, NY, 2015
John Zurier: Matrix 255", Berkeley Art Museum, Berkeley, CA, 2014
John Zurier: Recent Paintings, Lawrence Markey, San Antonio, TX, 2014
Knowledge is a blue naiveté, Galerie Nordenhake, Berlin, Germany, 2013
A spring a thousand years ago," Peter Blum Gallery, NY, 2013
John Zurier: Watercolors," Gallery Paule Anglim, San Francisco, CA, 2013
John Zurier, Patrick de Brock Gallery, Knokke, Belgium, 2012
John Zurier Paintings and Watercolors, Gallery Paule Anglim, San Francisco, CA, 2011
White Paintings and Night Paintings, Peter Blum Chelsea, NY, 2010
Nordic Paintings, Galería Javier López, Madrid, 2010
John Zurier - New Paintings, Gallery Paule Anglim, San Francisco, CA, June 2009
John Zurier, Galeria Javier López, Madrid, Spain, 2007
John Zurier: New Works, Peter Blum SoHo, New York, NY, 2007
John Zurier: New Paintings, Gallery Paule Anglim, San Francisco, CA, 2005
John Zurier: New Paintings, Larry Becker Contemporary Art, Philadelphia, PA, 2005
John Zurier, Gallery Paule Anglim, San Francisco, 2003
John Zurier: Oblaka, Peer, London, 2003
John Zurier, Gallery Paul Anglim, San Francisco, 2001
John Zurier Paintings 1997-1999, Gallery Paule Anglim, San Francisco (catalogue with interview by Lawrence Rinder), 2000
John Zurier: Monotypes, Aurobora Press, San Francisco, CA, 1999
John Zurier: Abstract Paintings, Gallery Paule Anglim, San Francisco, CA, 1994
John Zurier: Monotypes, Concourse Gallery, Bank of America World Headquarters, San Francisco, CA, 1990
John Zurier: New Paintings, Gallery Paule Anglim, San Francisco, CA, 1989
John Zurier, Gallery Paule Anglim, San Francisco, CA, 1986
John Zurier, Pamela Auchincloss Gallery, Santa Barbara, 1985
John Zurier, Dana Reich Gallery, San Francisco, CA, 1984
John Zurier, Sun Gallery, Hayward, CA, 1984

Selected group exhibitions
Be With Me, a Small Exhibition of Large Paintings, New Mexico Museum of Art, Santa Fe, NM, October 2016 - April 2017
A Studio In Iceland, Anglim Gilbert Gallery, San Francisco, CA, November 2015 - January 2016
Paper Trail: Contemporary Prints, Drawings, and Photographs from the Collection, Colby College Museum of Art, 2015
30th São Paulo Biennial, São Paulo, Brazil, 2012
Black and White, Jason McCoy Gallery, New York, NY, 2010
California Biennial, Orange County Museum of Art, Newport Beach, CA, 2010
Le Tableau, Cheim and Read Gallery, New York, NY, 2010
Galaxy: A Hundred or So Stars Visible to the Naked Eye, Berkeley Art Museum, University of California, Berkeley, CA, 2009
Gwangju Biennale, Gwangju, Korea, 2008
Selections from the Concrete, El Centro College, Dallas, TX, 2007
Line and Surface: Works on Paper, Peter Blum Gallery, New York, NY, 2006
Exodus: Between Promise and Fulfillment, curated by David Austin, Kettle’s Yard, Cambridge, United Kingdom, 2003
Whitney Biennial, Whitney Museum of American Art, New York, NY, 2002
Minimalism: Then and Now, Berkeley Art Museum, Berkeley, CA, 2001
Practice and Process: New Painterly Abstraction in California, Armory Center for the Arts, Pasadena and the Richmond Art Center, Richmond, CA, 1998
Three Painters: Anne Appleby, Gregg Renfrow, John Zurier, Arts Benicia Center, Benicia, CA, 1996
Donald Feasel, Philip Morsberger, John Zurier: Recent Paintings, Shasta College Gallery, Redding, CA, 1993
Chain Reaction Six, San Francisco Arts Commission Gallery, San Francisco, CA, 1990
Sixteen Young Bay Area Artists, Colorado State University Art Gallery, Fort Collins, CO, 1988
Expressive Abstraction, Berkeley Art Center, Berkeley, CA, 1986
MFA/UCB/1984, University of California, Berkeley Art Museum, Berkeley, CA, 1984

Monotype projects
Aurobora Press, San Francisco, CA, 1998 and 2002
Garner Tullis Workshop, Santa Barbara, CA, 1989-1990
Garner Tullis Workshop, Emeryville, CA, 1985-1986

Awards and teaching
John Simon Guggenheim Fellowship, 2010
PresentEminent Adjunct Professor, California College of the Arts, 2006

Books, monographs and catalogs
John Zurier: Paintings 1981-2014, (artist monograph), Essay by Robert Storr and foreword by Lawrence Rinder, 2015
2012 São Paulo Bienal, The Imminence of Poetics, (catalog), Luis Pérez-Oramas, Tobi Maier, André Severo, Isabela Villanueva, 2012
Repeat After Me - Poems by Bill Berkson, Watercolors by John Zurier, Published by Gallery Paule Anglim, San Francisco, CA, 2011
2010 California Biennial: Orange County Museum of Art, (catalog), Sarah C. Bancroft, 2010
To: Night (Contemporary Representations of the Night), (catalog), curated by Joachim Pissarro, Mara Hoberman, Julia Moreno, 2008
The 7th Gwangju Biennial: 2008 Annual Report, (catalog), curated by Okwui Enwezor, et al., 2008
John Zurier Night Paintings: 2007-2008, (catalog), Larry Becker Contemporary Art, Philadelphia, PA, 2008
Pope, Alexander, John Zurier: New Paintings, (catalog), Text from “The Essay on Man” San Francisco, CA: Gallery Paule Anglim, 2005
EXODUS: Between Promise and Fulfillment, (catalog), Essay by Anthony Downey, Kettle's Yard, University of Cambridge: Cambridge, England, 2003
Rinder, Lawrence, et al. Whitney Biennial 2002, (catalog), New York: Whitney Museum of American Art, 2002
John Zurier Paintings 1997-1999, (catalog), Interview with Lawrence Rinder, San Francisco, CA: Gallery Paule Anglim, 2000
Practice and Process: New Painterly Abstraction in California, (catalog), Armory Center for the Arts and the Richmond Art Center, Pasadena and Richmond, CA, 1998
Abstraction Absolved: Ten Bay Area Painters, (catalog) Introduction by Keith Lachowicz, Oakland, CA: Mills College Art Gallery, 1996
Garner Tullis Workshop: Monotypes, (catalog) Introduction by Memory Holloway, Praz/Vully, Switzerland, Galerie Au Poisson Rouge, 1986

References

External links
John Zurier: Artists’ website
Anglim Gilbert Gallery
Peter Blum Gallery
Galerie Nordenhake
Lawerence Markey Inc.
Patrick De Brock Gallery
Galeria Javier Lopez

American abstract artists
American contemporary painters
20th-century American painters
20th-century American male artists
American male painters
21st-century American painters
21st-century American male artists
Artists from San Francisco
Artists from the San Francisco Bay Area
Living people
1956 births